The Texas Longhorns baseball program is a college baseball team that represents the University of Texas in the Big 12 Conference in the National Collegiate Athletic Association. The team has seen 14 individuals hold the head coach position since it started playing organized baseball in the 1895 season.  Two of these coaches had non-consecutive tenures.  Since 1911, only six people have held the position. The current coach is David Pierce, who led his first season in 2017.

Having served for 29 seasons, Cliff Gustafson holds the record for wins at 1,466 and winning percentage at .795.  Gustafson, Bibb Falk, and Augie Garrido each won 2 College World Series titles while in Austin.

Key

Coaches

Notes

References

Lists of college baseball head coaches in the United States

Texas Longhorns baseball coaches